Isabel de Cisneros (1666 - ca. 1714) was a Criollo colonial painter female born in the colony of Quito (Ecuador). She was the daughter of Miguel de Santiago, one of the most famous colonial Quito School painters. Often referred to as Isabel de Santiago, she however identified herself by Cisneros, a name she inherited from her mother.

Life 
Born in 1666 to Miguel de Santiago, a mestizo, and Andrea Cisneros y Alvarado, who was Spanish. She trained and worked in her father's workshop. She married Captain Antonio Egas, together they had five children. Miguel de Santiago outlived his three sons, wife, and other daughter, only Isabel outlived her father. She gains prominence in her father's studio after the departure of her father's gifted student Nicolás Goíbar.

Works 

She specialized in oil paintings of the childhood of the Virgin and of the baby Jesus, adorned with flowers and animals. It is speculated that she would have worked alongside her father on the Milagros de La virgen series (1699-1706) while she worked in his studio. One of her most famous works is a portrait of Juana de Jesus, which was painted posthumously. Contemporary writer, Francisco Javier Antonio, complimented the likeness, attributing its accuracy to Isabel having met Juana de Jesus multiple times. This work is the only securely attributed painting to Isabel de Cisneros, but unfortunately it has not survived, and there only remains a copy at the convent of Santa Clara, Quito. Juana "looks incredibly Quiteña with a long nose, a subdued smile, a narrow face, and delicate hands."

References 

1666 births
1714 deaths
17th-century Spanish painters
Spanish portrait painters
People from Quito
Spanish women artists
17th-century women artists